As of 2019, the discography of Spanish rock group Amaral consists of 8 studio albums, 2 live albums, 3 live DVDs/Blu-rays, 4 special edition box sets, 38 singles, and 1 EP. The group has released music through EMI International, Virgin Records, Capitol, Gatorama, and Antártida.

Studio albums
 Amaral (1998)
 Una pequeña parte del mundo (A little part of the world) (2000)
 Estrella de mar (Starfish) (2002)
 Pájaros en la cabeza (Birds on the head) (2005)
 Gato negro dragón rojo (double album) (Black cat red dragon) (2008)
 Hacia lo salvaje (Into the wild) (2011)
 Nocturnal (2015)
 Salto al color (2019) – No. 1 Spain

Live albums
 La barrera del sonido (The sound barrier)  (2009)
 Superluna: Directo desde el Planeta Tierra (Supermoon: Live from Planet Earth) (2017)

Special editions
 Caja Especial Navidad (Christmas Special box set)  (2006)
 1998-2008 (2012)
 4 Álbumes (2013)
 Nocturnal Solar Sessions (2017)

EPs
 Granada  (2009)

DVDs & Blu-rays
 El comienzo del big bang: Gira 2005 (The beginning of the Big Bang: 2005 Tour)  (2005)
 La barrera del sonido (The sound barrier)  (2009)
 Superluna: Directo desde el Planeta Tierra (Supermoon: Live from Planet Earth) (2017)

Singles

References

Discographies of Spanish artists